Saperda quercus is a species of beetle in the family Cerambycidae. It was described by Charpentier in 1825. It is known from Turkey, Romania, Bosnia and Herzegovina, Jordan, Serbia, Bulgaria, Greece, Syria, and possibly Hungary. It feeds on Quercus coccifera.

Subspecies
 Saperda quercus quercus Charpentier, 1825
 Saperda quercus ocellata Abeille de Perrin, 1895

References

quercus
Beetles described in 1825